The Church of St. Felix is located in the parish of El Pino in Asturias, Spain. It was established in 1751. It has been registered as a national monument in the register of Bien de Interés Cultural since 1973.

See also
Asturian art
Catholic Church in Spain

References

1751 establishments in Spain
Churches in Asturias
Bien de Interés Cultural landmarks in Asturias